Saharsa College of Engineering is a government engineering college managed by the Department of Science and Technology, Bihar. It is affiliated with Aryabhatta Knowledge University, Patna and approved by All India Council for Technical Education. College was established in the year 2017. It is situated in Saharsa district of Bihar.

Admission 
Admission in the college for four years B.Tech. course is made through UGEAC conducted by Bihar Combined Entrance Competitive Examination Board. To apply for UGEAC, appearing in JEE Main of that admission year is required.

Departments 

 Civil Engineering, Prof. Mithilesh Kuamr, HoD
 Mechanical Engineering, Prof. Ramesh Kumar, HoD
 Electrical Engineering, Prof. Bhagwan Shree Ram , HoD
 Electronics & Communication Engineering, Prof. Md Tabish Raza, HoD
 Computer Science and Engineering in Data Science, Prof. Ankur Priyadarshi, HoD

References

External links 
 Saharsa
 Official website
 BCECE Board website
 Aryabhatta Knowledge University website
 DST, Bihar website

Engineering colleges in Bihar
Colleges affiliated to Aryabhatta Knowledge University
2017 establishments in Bihar
Educational institutions established in 2017